Ridgeland is a station on the Chicago Transit Authority's 'L' system, serving the Green Line. It is located in the suburb of Oak Park just west of Chicago. To the north of the station is the triple tracked Union Pacific/West Line.

Station layout
The station consists of a two tracks single island platform with an entrance at the west end of the platform. There formerly existed an entrance at the eastern end of the platform, but this entrance has been permanently closed.

Bus connections
CTA
  86 Narragansett/Ridgeland (Weekdays only) 

Pace
  309 Lake Street 
  313 St. Charles Road 
  314 Ridgeland Avenue (Monday-Saturday only)

Notes and references

Notes

References

External links 

Ridgeland station page at Chicago-L.org
Ridgeland Avenue entrance from Google Maps Street View

CTA Green Line stations
Railway stations in the United States opened in 1901
Oak Park, Illinois